João Pedro Pinto Martins (born 20 June 1982) is a professional footballer who plays as a forward for Luxembourg club FC RM Hamm Benfica. 

Born in Portugal, he represented Angola at international level.

Club career
Martins was born in Lisbon. During his career in Portugal, spent in no higher than the second division and with little impact, he represented S.C. Lourinhanense, F.C. Alverca, G.D. Chaves, C.D. Fátima and G.D. Tourizense. He first moved abroad in 2007, signing with Russia's FC Sibir Novosibirsk also at that level.

Martins then moved to nearby Latvia and joined FK Ventspils. However, after a few months, he was released from his contract and signed with C.D. Primeiro de Agosto; he continued playing in the land of his ancestors the following years, appearing for C.R.D. Libolo and F.C. Bravos do Maquis.

References

External links

1982 births
Living people
Portuguese sportspeople of Angolan descent
Portuguese footballers
Angolan footballers
Footballers from Lisbon
Association football forwards
Liga Portugal 2 players
Segunda Divisão players
F.C. Alverca players
G.D. Chaves players
C.D. Fátima players
G.D. Tourizense players
Russian First League players
FC Sibir Novosibirsk players
Latvian Higher League players
FK Ventspils players
Girabola players
C.D. Primeiro de Agosto players
C.R.D. Libolo players
F.C. Bravos do Maquis players
Luxembourg National Division players
US Mondorf-les-Bains players
Angola international footballers
Angola A' international footballers
2011 African Nations Championship players
Portuguese expatriate footballers
Angolan expatriate footballers
Expatriate footballers in Russia
Expatriate footballers in Latvia
Expatriate footballers in Luxembourg
Portuguese expatriate sportspeople in Russia
Portuguese expatriate sportspeople in Latvia
Portuguese expatriate sportspeople in Luxembourg
Angolan expatriate sportspeople in Russia
Angolan expatriate sportspeople in Latvia
Angolan expatriate sportspeople in Luxembourg